Chris Zane is an American music producer, engineer and mixer based in London. He's worked with an array of artists such as  Jack Antonoff, Passion Pit, St. Lucia, Holy Ghost!,  and Friendly Fires.

Discography

2017
Chloe Howl - "Magnetic" (s/r)
RIVRS - "The Berlin Mixtape" (Atlantic Records)
Shy Luv - "Time" (Black Butter Records/Sony Music)
Strong Asian Mothers - Animal EP (s/r )
Sarah Close - "Caught Up" (Kodiak Club/Parlophone)
VHS Collection - "Wide Awake" (s/r)

2016 
 Bat for Lashes - "Sunday Love (radio version)" (Parlophone)
 St. Lucia - "Matter" (Columbia Records)
 VITAMIN - "This Isn't Love" (SONY) 
 Sizzy Rocket - "Thrills" (Yebo Music) 
 JMR - "To Be Alone With You" (Republic Records)
WILLS - "WILLS" (IAMSOUND Records)
Temptress - "Guilty Pleasure" (Machine Records)

2015 
 Passion Pit - "Kindred" (Columbia Records) 
 FRANKIE - "Dreamstate" EP (RCA Records) 
 Penguin Prison - "Lost In New York" (Downtown Records)
 Jack & Eliza - "Gentle Warnings" (Yebo)

2014
 Alex Winston - "Careless" (Atlantic Records)
Miniature Tigers - "Cruel Runnings" (Yebo Music)
Natas Loves You - "The Eight Continent" (3ème Bureau)

2013
Jinja Safari - "Jinja Safari" (Universal Records)
Chloe Howl - "Rumour" (Columbia Records)
St. Lucia - "When the Night" (Columbia Records)

2012 
Pacific Air - "Long Live KOKO EP" (Universal Republic)
Holy Ghost! - "It Gets Dark" (DFA)
Passion Pit - "Gossamer" (Columbia Records)
Nelly Furtado - "The Spirit Indestructible" (Interscope Records)
Ruby Frost - "Volition" (Universal)
Stepdad - "Wildlife Pop" (Black Bell Records/Warner Bros. Records)
Devin - "Romancing" (Frenchkiss Records)
Geographer - "Myth" '(Modern Art Records/Warner Bros. Records)
Devin Therriault - Romancing  (No Evil)

2011
Heartsrevolution - "Ride or Die" (Kitsune)
Friendly Fires - "Pala" (XL)
Holy Ghost! - "Holy Ghost!" (DFA)
Asobi Seksu - "Fluorescence" (Polyvinyl)
Chapel Club - "Surfacing" (Polydor)
Ruby Frost - "Goodnight" (Universal)

2010
The Hundred in the Hands - "This City", "Dressed in Dresden" (Warp)
Les Savy Fav - "Root for Ruin" (Frenchkiss/Wichita Recordings)
The Walkmen - "Lisbon" (Fat Possum)
Suckers - "Wild Smile" (Frenchkiss Records)
Holy Ghost! - "Static on the Wire" (DFA)
Passion Pit -  Manners (Bonus) (Columbia Records)
The Hundred in the Hands - "This Desert" (Warp)
Shy Child - "Liquid Love" (Wall of Sound)

2009
 Mumford and Sons - "Little Lion Man EP" (Universal)
 Passion Pit -  Manners (Frenchkiss Records/Columbia Records)
 Harlem Shakes - "Technicolor Health" (Gigantic Music)
 The Rakes - "Klang" (V2 Records/Universal Records)
 Asobi Seksu - "Hush" (Polyvinyl)

2008
 Frances - "All the While" (Gigantic Music)
 The Walkmen - "You & Me" (Gigantic Music)
 Tokyo Police Club - "Elephant Shell" (Saddle Creek)
 Bridges and Powerlines - "Ghost Types" (Citybird Records)

2007
 Les Savy Fav - "Let's Stay Friends" (Frenchkiss Records/Wichita Recordings)
 White Rabbits - "Fort Nightly" (Say Hey Records)
 Asobi Seksu - "Strawberries" single (One Little Indian)
 Shy Child - "Noise Won't Stop" (Kill Rock Stars/PIAS)
 Les Savy Fav - "What Would Wolves Do?" single (Universal Records/Wichita Recordings)
 Asobi Seksu - "Stay Awake" single (Gigantic Music)
 The Boggs - "Forts" (Gigantic Music)
 Tokyo Police Club - "Your English Is Good" single (Memphis Industries)
 Harlem Shakes - "Burning Birthdays" (self-released)

2006
 Les Savy Fav - "Accidental Deaths" single (Rococo/Popfrenzy)
 Ambulance LTD - "New English" EP (TVT Records)
 Thunderbirds Are Now! - "Make History" (Frenchkiss Records)
 Human Television - "Look At Who You're Talking To" (Gigantic Music)
 Asobi Seksu - "Citrus" (Friendly Fire Recordings/One Little Indian)
 Les Savy Fav - "Plagues & Snakes" single (Frenchkiss Records)

2005
 Shy Child - "Noise Won't Stop" single (WEA/Warner Bros. Records)
 Calla - "It Dawned On Me" single (Beggars Banquet Records)
 Tangiers - "The Family Myth" (Frenchkiss Records)
 Lee Ranaldo - "Drift" (Plexifilm)
 Calla - "Collisions (Beggars Banquet Records)
 The Cloud Room - "The Cloud Room" (Gigantic Music)

2004
 Calla - "Strangler" (Rykodisc)
 INOUK - "Search for the Bees" EP (Say Hey Records)
 Shy Child - "One With the Sun" (Say Hey Records)
 INOUK - "No Danger" (Astralwerks/Say Hey Records)
 Ambulance LTD - "LP" (TVT Records)
 Les Savy Fav - "Inches" (Frenchkiss Records)
 Human Television - "Human Television" (Gigantic Music)
 Les Savy Fav - "Hold Onto Your Genre" (Rococo/Popfrenzy)
 Mendoza Line - "Fortune" (Cooking Vinyl)
 Les Savy Fav - "Fading Vibes" (Rococo/Popfrenzy)
 Human Television - "All Songs Written By" (Gigantic Music)

2003
 Calla - "Televise" (Arena Rock Recordings)
 Mink Lungs - "I'll Take It" (Arena Rock Recordings)
 Ambulance LTD - "Ambulance LTD" EP (TVT Records)
 The Boggs - "We Are The Boggs We Are" (Arena Rock Recordings)

Related links
 http://www.chris-zane.com
 
 https://web.archive.org/web/20100917172509/http://albumcredits.com/Profile/586940
 http://www.discogs.com/artist/Chris+Zane
 http://www.sonicscoop.com/2009/09/23/chris-zane-on-passion-pit-the-walkmen-awesome-drum-sounds/
 https://web.archive.org/web/20100502012449/http://www.izotope.com/artists/chris_zane.asp
https://web.archive.org/web/20120720002703/http://www.biglifemanagement.co.uk/producers/producer/chris_zane
http://www.echobeachmanagement.com/artist/chris-zane/

References

Record producers from New York (state)
Living people
Year of birth missing (living people)
Businesspeople from New York City
Place of birth missing (living people)